The Socialist Republican Party (SRP) was an Indian political party from the state of Kerala.

History 
The council of SNDP Yogam decided to form A political party on 1974 November, on the basis of that decision the party was formed and declared in 1975 March 13 with the blessings of the SNDP Yogam. with an intention of the uplift of backwards, dalits and minorities to establish social justice by providing Democratic Socialist Casteless and Classless and Secular pattern of Society. The party was created as an answer to the formation of the National Democratic Party by the Nair Service Society.

The party had entered into the agitation for the implementation of Mandal commission report for the establishment of communal reservation.

The party was a member of Kerala's United Democratic Front during the 1980s.

The party achieved early success. In the 1982 Elections, the party secured two assembly seats and a minister.  the members of Kerala legislative Assembly representing SRP  where Justice N Sreenivasan representing Kottayam assembly Constituency and T. V. Vijayarajan 	representing Karunagapally assembly Constituency, later C G Janardhanan representing Kodakara assembly Constituency joined with SRP.

Shri. N. Sreenivasan, renowned  leader of SRP and SNDP, become the minister for excise representing party in the ministry headed by Karunakaran.

A retired District Judge who had been President of SNDP Yogam for over six years and was also the Chairman of S.R.P. for seven years. Shri. N. Sreenivasan became elected to the Kerala Legislative Assembly in 1982 from Kottayam constituency, held the portfolio of excise minister in the ministry headed by K Karunakaran.

During 1986, the Socialist Republican Party split into two factions - SRP(V) and SRP(S). In the Election of 1987, neither fraction was able to win a seat. SRP and NDP disappeared as political entities by 1996.   the functions of SRP has been in idle status from 1996 to 2011 under the leadership of S Ranjith (which is called the darken era of SRP) the party is kept idle by the Ranjith in order to protect the interest  of SNDP yogam general secretary Vellaplli Nadesan, in 2011 a group of socialists under the  leader ship of               O V Sreedath (contact number 99461 07999) who had been the former state secretary of Janathadal (S) Kerala State Committee had joined with SRP,  and he had been nominated as the Vice Chairman of SRP. Under his leadership and initiative the 8th party conference of   SRP had conducted at Ernakulam Shikshak Sadan on 19 May 2013, in that conference the     O V  Sreedath was elected as working chairman of the party and S Ranjith continued as general secretary, in 16th loksabha election contested in 2014 the party had contested from Ernakulam Loksabha assembly Constuancy and from Thiruvananthapuram loksabha assembly Constituency; the party achieved   6156 votes from Ernakulam loksabha; assembly Constituency even if party doesn't have any booth committee. In the arises of BDJS the Ranjith demanded for the merging of SRP with BDJS, the party under the leadership of  O V Sreedath had opposed the proposal later the issues lead to some legal issues. On 13 October 2019 the 9th party state conference was contested at Kozhikode EMS indoor stadium the conference had elected the     O V Sreedath as the general secretary of the party, now the party is in an intensive moment under the leadership of O V Sreedath to be get raised as one of the major political party in India With that interest trying to expand its work of missions and missionaries throughout India.

References

Political parties in Kerala
Political parties established in 1975
1975 establishments in Kerala